The Nikon 1 Nikkor VR 10-100 mm f/4.5-5.6 PD-Zoom for the 1 series' unique CX format (crop factor 2.7) is a Superzoom lens manufactured by Nikon, introduced in September 2011 for use on Nikon CX format mirrorless interchangeable-lens cameras. 

It integrates a high amount of technologies: 21 elements in 14 groups including 1 High Refractive Index (HRI), 3 Extra-low Dispersion (ED) and 2 aspherical lenses, Super Integrated Coating (SIC), internal focusing (IF) with world's fastest quiet ultra-fast Voice Coil motor (VCM), silent 3-speed PD-Zoom, Vibration Reduction (VR II), retractable lens mechanism and 7 rounded diaphragm blades. 

Together with the Canon EF 28-300mm lens it is the only current superzoom with 20 elements or more. There's no distance scale and it doesn't feature an aperture ring.

Performance
Several reviews state the extremely high speed without any noise and very high optical quality, especially excellent sharpness, exceeding many other products and being a positive exception compared to other superzooms. As disadvantages are mentioned its size, weight and price. It received very good valuations for photos, with additional advantages seen in the HD video area.

See also
Nikon 1 series
Nikon CX format
Nikon 1-mount
List of Nikon compatible lenses with integrated autofocus-motor

References 

Nikon 1-mount lenses
Camera lenses introduced in 2011